Gaylord Hotels is the large convention hotel brand of Marriott International. As of June 30, 2020, it consists of five large hotels with 9,918 rooms, along with attached convention centers and one overflow support hotel property, in addition to one hotel with 1,903 rooms in the pipeline. The properties are owned by Ryman Hospitality Properties, Inc.

History
Before changing its name and handing over the management of the hotels to Marriott, Ryman Hospitality was named Gaylord Entertainment Company. Until the Nashville hotel's 1996 expansion to almost 3,000 rooms and subsequent announcement of a future Opryland Hotel Florida, the hospitality group was a modest division of the Opryland USA properties of Gaylord Entertainment. 
 
Gaylord Opryland in Nashville, Tennessee, along with the Inn at Opryland, a Gaylord Hotel
Gaylord Palms in Kissimmee, Florida
Gaylord Texan in Grapevine, Texas
Gaylord National in National Harbor, Maryland (near Washington, D.C.)
Gaylord Rockies in Aurora, Colorado

A sixth property is planned:
Gaylord Pacific in Chula Vista, California (expected opening 2025)

In 2010, Gaylord struck a deal with DreamWorks Animation to create character breakfasts and other activities with Shrek, Kung Fu Panda and other DreamWorks characters.

On May 31, 2012, Marriott International agreed to buy the rights to manage Gaylord's four hotels for $210 million in cash.

From 2002 to 2009, Gaylord Hotels was the primary sponsor of the Music City Bowl, a postseason college football game held each year in Nashville. As of 2011, the company continues to be a secondary sponsor.

Hotel rooms at Gaylord resort and convention centers

References

External links
 Official site
 

 
Marriott International brands
Companies based in Nashville, Tennessee
American companies established in 1977
Hotels established in 1977
1977 establishments in Tennessee
Ryman Hospitality Properties
Companies listed on the New York Stock Exchange